Schismatorhynchos nukta is a species of cyprinid fish, also known as nukta. It inhabits Krishna and Kaveri river systems in the states of Maharashta, Andhra Pradesh, Karnataka, and Tamil Nadu. It is found in large streams and rivers with sand and boulder bed. It grows to  total length.

Schismatorhynchos nukta is threatened by heavy fishing pressure and ecosystem degradation. It is becoming a rare species and has already disappeared from parts of its range.

References

Cyprinidae
Cyprinid fish of Asia
Freshwater fish of India
Endemic fauna of India
Taxa named by William Henry Sykes
Fish described in 1839